Raghnailt, Norse-Gaelic female given name.

Beaers of the name

 Raghnailt ingen Amhlaibh, Princess of Isle of Man, fl. 12th century.
 Raghnailt Ní Conchobair, Princess of Connacht and Ireland, died 1211.
 Raghnailt Ní Fhergail, died 1255.
 Raghnailt Bean Uí Madadháin, died 1268.
 Raghnailt Ní Raghallaigh, died 1325.
 Raghnailt Ní Bradaigh, died 1381.
 Raghnailt Níc Aodha Uí Choncobhair, died 1393.
 Raghnailt Ní Birn, died 1417.
 Raghnailt Dubh Ní Briain, died 1421.
 Raghnailt Ní Anligi, died 1473.
 Raghnailt Níc Con Mara, died 1486.
 Raghnailt Ní Con Mara, Queen of Thomnd, fl. c. 1500.

External links
 http://medievalscotland.org/kmo/AnnalsIndex/Feminine/Ragnailt.shtml

Irish-language feminine given names